Jean Saidman (19 November 1897 – 6 July 1949) was a French radiologist who promoted the idea of heliotherapy or actinotherapy, using solar radiation to cure various diseases such as tuberculosis. He built special rotating structures called solariums at Aix-les-Bains and Vallauris in France and at Jamnagar in India.

Saidman was born in Fălticeni in the Romanian Old Kingdom and became a naturalized citizen of France in 1919. Saidman believed in the use of radiation, ultraviolet and infrared rays from the sun for various therapeutic purposes. He founded the French Society of Photobiology, invented a skin sensitometer and founded an Institute of Actinology in 1927 in the Vaugirard quartier of Paris. He build revolving solariums to track the sun, fitted with lenses, and special filters for specific wavelengths to treat patients. He noted that patients differed in their needs and skin sensitivities and developed protocols to determine them. When the ruler of Jamnagar, Ranjitsinhji (1872-1933) visited France, he noted that India had no shortage of sunlight to help treat patients, and invited Saidman to construct a similar system in Jamnagar (it was completed after the death of Ranjitsinhji and named as the Ranjit Institute of Poly-Radio Therapy, Jamnagar). The lenses and other parts of the Jamnagar solarium were destroyed in a cyclone but the structure still stands.

References

External links 
 Solariums
 Solariums, with a portrait of Saidman (in French)

1897 births
1949 deaths
Light therapy advocates
Moldavian Jews
Naturalized citizens of France
People from Fălticeni
Romanian emigrants to France
Romanian Jews
Romanian physicians